Parobereopsis nigrosternalis is a species of beetle in the family Cerambycidae, and the only species in the genus Parobereopsis. It was described by Stephan von Breuning in 1956.

References

Saperdini
Beetles described in 1956